Heteromicta ochraceella is a species of snout moth in the genus Heteromicta. It was described by Émile Louis Ragonot in 1901. It is found in Australia (including Queensland).

References

Moths described in 1901
Tirathabini